Samuel Ichiye Hayakawa (July 18, 1906 – February 27, 1992) was a Canadian-born American academic and politician of Japanese ancestry. A professor of English, he served as president of San Francisco State University and then as U.S. Senator from California from 1977 to 1983.

Early life and education 
Born in Vancouver, British Columbia, Hayakawa was educated in the public schools of Calgary, Alberta, and Winnipeg, Manitoba, and graduated from the University of Manitoba in 1927. He received his MA in English from McGill University in 1928 and his PhD in the discipline from the University of Wisconsin–Madison in 1935.

Academic career
Professionally, Hayakawa was a linguist, psychologist, semanticist, teacher, and writer. He served as an instructor at the University of Wisconsin from 1936 to 1939 and at the Armour Institute of Technology (Illinois Institute of Technology as of 1940) from 1939 to 1948.

His first book on semantics, Language in Thought and Action,  expanded its forerunner (and Book-of-the-Month Club selection) Language in Action, written from 1938 to 1941. With five editions from 1949 to 1991, Language in Thought and Action helped to popularize Alfred Korzybski's general semantics and semantics in general, while semantics or theory of meaning was overwhelmed by mysticism, propagandism and even scientism.

Hayakawa lectured at the University of Chicago from 1950 to 1955. He presented a talk at the 1954 Conference of Activity Vector Analysts at Lake George, New York, in which he discussed a theory of personality from the semantic point of view. It was later published as The Semantic Barrier. The definitive lecture discussed the Darwinism of the "survival of self" as contrasted with the "survival of self-concept." His ideas on general semantics influenced A. E. van Vogt's Null-A novels, The World of Null-A and The Pawns of Null-A. Van Vogt in The World of Null-A (i.e., non-Aristotelian) makes Hayakawa a character, introducing him as: "Professor Hayakawa is today's Mr. Null-A himself, the elected head of the International Society for General Semantics."

Hayakawa was an English professor at San Francisco State College (now San Francisco State University) from 1955 to 1968. In the early 1960s, he helped organize the Anti Digit Dialing League, a San Francisco group that opposed the introduction of all-digit telephone exchange names. Among the students he trained were commune leader Stephen Gaskin and author Gerald Haslam. He was named acting president of San Francisco State College on November 26, 1968, during a student strike, when Ronald Reagan was governor of California and Joseph Alioto was mayor of San Francisco. On July 9, 1969, the California State Colleges Board of Trustees appointed Hayakawa the ninth president of San Francisco State. Hayakawa retired on July 10, 1973.

Hayakawa wrote a column for the Register and Tribune Syndicate from 1970 to 1976. In 1973, Hayakawa changed his political affiliation from the Democratic Party to the Republican Party and became president emeritus at what became San Francisco State University.

Student strike at San Francisco State College
From November 1968 to March 1969, there was a student strike at San Francisco State College in order to establish an ethnic studies program. It was a major news event at the time and chapter in the radical history of the United States and the Bay Area. The strike was led by the Third World Liberation Front supported by Students for a Democratic Society, the Black Panthers and the countercultural community.

The students presented fifteen "non-negotiable demands", including a Black Studies department chaired by sociologist Nathan Hare independent of the university administration, open admission for all black students to "put an end to racism", and the unconditional, immediate end to the War in Vietnam and the university's involvement. It was threatened that if these demands were not immediately and completely satisfied the entire campus was to be forcibly shut down. Hayakawa became popular with conservative voters during this period after he pulled out the wires from the loudspeakers on a protesters' van at an outdoor rally. Hayakawa relented on December 6, 1968, and announced the creation of a Black Studies program at the University.

Political career

Hayakawa won an unexpected victory in the 1976 Republican Senate primary over three better-known career politicians: former HEW Secretary Robert Finch, long-time U.S. Representative Alphonzo Bell and former California Lieutenant Governor John L. Harmer. Much like Jimmy Carter, Hayakawa touted himself as a political outsider.

On the Democratic side, incumbent Senator John Tunney faced a surprisingly strong challenge from another political outsider, Tom Hayden. Hayden's extremely liberal candidacy forced Tunney to run more to the left in the primary, which hurt him in the general election.

Nevertheless, Tunney was favored to easily win re-election. Comfortably ahead in the polls, Tunney did not aggressively campaign until the final weeks before the election. But Hayakawa's position as a political outsider was popular in the wake of the Watergate scandal. In addition, Tunney had a high absenteeism rate while serving in the Senate and missed numerous votes. Hayakawa exploited this with a television ad that showed an empty chair in the U.S. Senate chamber. Hayakawa gradually closed the gap with Tunney, and ultimately defeated him by just over three percentage points.

During his Senate campaign, Hayakawa spoke about the proposal to transfer possession of the Panama Canal and Canal Zone from the United States to Panama. He said, "We should keep the Panama Canal. After all, we stole it fair and square." However, in 1978 he helped win Senate approval of the Torrijos–Carter Treaties, which transferred control of the zone and canal to Panama. He also supported a bill that led to the creation of the Commission on Wartime Relocation and Internment of Civilians, which examined the causes and effects of the incarceration of Japanese Americans during World War II. During his time in the Senate, Hayakawa was one of three Japanese Americans in the chamber, the other two being Daniel Inouye and Spark Matsunaga, both of Hawaii.

Hayakawa planned to run for re-election in 1982 but trailed other Republican candidates badly in early polls and was short on money. He dropped out of the race early in the year and was ultimately succeeded by Republican San Diego Mayor Pete Wilson. To date, he is the only Japanese American Republican to have served in the U.S. Senate.

Hayakawa and John Tanton founded the political lobbying organization U.S. English, which is dedicated to making English the official language of the United States. Despite his support for creating the Commission on Wartime Relocation and Internment of Civilians, Hayakawa, who lived in Chicago as a Canadian citizen during World War II and thus was not subject to confinement, argued that the internment of Japanese Americans was beneficial and that Japanese Americans should not be paid for "fulfilling their obligations" to submit to Executive Order 9066.

Personal life 
Hayakawa was a resident of Mill Valley, California, until his death in nearby Greenbrae, in 1992. He had an abiding interest in traditional jazz and wrote extensively on that subject, including several erudite sets of album liner notes. Sometimes in his lectures on semantics, he was joined by the respected traditional jazz pianist Don Ewell, whom Hayakawa employed to demonstrate various points in which he analyzed semantic and musical principles. Hayakawa was news media reporters' favorite fodder, as he was often found napping through important legislative voting. His daughter, Wynne Hayakawa, is a painter.

See also
List of Asian Americans and Pacific Islands Americans in the United States Congress
List of United States senators born outside the United States

Bibliography
 Hayakawa, S. I. Choose the Right Word: A Modern Guide to Synonyms and Related Words. 1968. Reprint. New York: Perennial Library, 1987. Originally published as Funk & Wagnalls Modern Guide to Synonyms and Related Words.
 Hayakawa, S. I. "Education Revisited". In The World Today, edited by Phineas J. Sparer. Memphis: Memphis State University Press, 1975.
 Hayakawa, S. I. Language in Thought and Action. 1939. Enlarged ed. San Diego: Harcourt Brace Jovanovich, 1978. Originally published as Language in Action.
 Hayakawa, S. I. Symbol, Status, and Personality. New York: Harcourt, Brace & World, 1963.
 Hayakawa, S. I. Through the Communication Barrier: On Speaking, Listening, and Understanding. Edited by Arthur Chandler. New York: Harper & Row, 1979.
 Hayakawa, S. I., ed. Language, Meaning, and Maturity. New York: Harper & Brothers, 1954.
 Hayakawa, S. I., ed. Our Language and Our World. 1959. Reprint. Freeport, NY: Books for Libraries Press, 1971.
 Hayakawa, S. I., ed. The Use and Misuse of Language. Greenwich, CT: Fawcett Publications, 1964.
 Hayakawa, S. I., and William Dresser, eds. Dimensions of Meaning. Indianapolis: Bobbs-Merrill Co., 1970. Includes Hayakawa's essays "General Semantics and the Cold War Mentality" and "Semantics and Sexuality".
 Paris, Richard, and Janet Brown, eds. Quotations from Chairman S. I. Hayakawa. San Francisco: n.p., 1969.

References

 Fox, R. F. (1991). A conversation with the Hayakawas. The English Journal, Vol. 80, No. 2 (Feb., 1991), pp. 36–40.
 Haslam, Gerald, and Janice E. Haslam. In Thought and Action: The Enigmatic Life of S. I. Hayakawa (U. of Nebraska Press; 2011) 427 pages; scholarly biography

External links

 
 Samuel I. Hayakawa papers at the Hoover Institution Archives
 
 Australian General Semantics Society

|-

|-

1906 births
1992 deaths
20th-century American politicians
Linguists from the United States
California Democrats
California politicians of Japanese descent
California Republicans
Canadian emigrants to the United States
Linguists from Canada
Canadian people of Japanese descent
Deaths from dementia in California
Deaths from Alzheimer's disease
English-only movement
General semantics
Illinois Institute of Technology faculty
Politicians from Vancouver
McGill University alumni
Members of the United States Congress of Japanese descent
Asian-American United States senators
American politicians of Japanese descent
People from Mill Valley, California
People with acquired American citizenship
Presidents of San Francisco State University
Republican Party United States senators from California
San Francisco State University faculty
Semanticists
University of Manitoba alumni
University of Wisconsin–Madison College of Letters and Science alumni
20th-century linguists
20th-century American academics
Asian conservatism in the United States